The women's 25 metre pistol event at the 2018 Asian Games in Jakarta, Indonesia took place on 22 August at the Jakabaring International Shooting Range.

Schedule
All times are Western Indonesia Time (UTC+07:00)

Records

Results
Legend
SO — Shoot-off

Qualification

Final

References

External links
Schedule

Women's 25 metre pistol